The Danville micropolitan area may refer to:

The Danville, Kentucky micropolitan area, United States
The Danville, Virginia micropolitan area, United States

See also
Danville metropolitan area (disambiguation)
Danville (disambiguation)